Kuyeda is a rural locality (a settlement) and the administrative center of Kuyedinsky District of Perm Krai, Russia. Population:

History
The settlement started in 1915 as a railway station during the construction of the Kazan–Yekaterinburg line. It was named after a nearby village which, in turn, got its name from the Kuyeda River.

References

Rural localities in Kuyedinsky District